Odds 777 is a 1932 Danish family film directed by George Schnéevoigt. The film stars Liva Weel and Inger Stender.

Cast
Liva Weel as Hansy Hansen 
Emanuel Gregers as  Godsejer Rosen 
Inger Stender as Inga Rosen 
Angelo Bruun as Hans Berg 
Svend Bille as Overretssagfører Sadolin 
Schiøler Linck as  Nicolaisen 
Axel Frische as Martin 
Helga Frier as Johanne 
Poul Reichhardt as Tjener på Marienlyst 
Emil Hass Christensen as Tjener på Marienlyst 
Gull-Maj Norin

External links
 

1930s Danish-language films
1932 films
1932 musical films
Films directed by George Schnéevoigt
Danish musical films
Danish black-and-white films